Portroe GAA is a Tipperary GAA club which is located in County Tipperary, Ireland. Both hurling and Gaelic football are played in the "North-Tipperary" divisional competitions. The club is centred on the village of Portroe which is eight miles outside Nenagh.

History
Portroe is in the centre of a traditional slate quarrying district of Northwest Tipperary, several kilometers outside Nenagh, that sent many emigrants to the Vermont USA slate belt in the 19th century, where to this day their descendants continue to receive honours in American football, basketball, baseball, soccer, athletics and distance running. The local school side being the Fair Haven "Slaters" Many other natives of this area emigrated to Australia.

Honours
 North Tipperary Senior Hurling Championship (1) 2012
 Tipperary Intermediate Hurling Championship (1) 1990
 North Tipperary Intermediate Hurling Championship (4) 1950, 1981, 1983, 1990
 North Tipperary Intermediate Hurling League (1) 1988
 North Tipperary Junior A Hurling Championship (4) 1915, 1916, 1968, 1973
 Tipperary Junior B Hurling Championship (1) 1998
 North Tipperary Junior B Hurling Championship (5) 1990, 1998, 2007, 2014, 2016
 North Tipperary Junior B Hurling League (2) 2012, 2018
 North Tipperary Junior A Football Championship (9) 1937, 1979, 1995, 1997, 1999, 2006, 2016, 2017, 2018
 North Tipperary Under-21 B Hurling Championship (4) 1980, 1982, 1989, 2011
 North Tipperary Under-21 C Hurling Championship (2) 2000, 2004
 North Tipperary Under-21 B Football Championship (5) 1989, 2006, 2011, 2015, 2017
 North Tipperary Minor B Hurling Championship (2) 2005, 2012
 Tipperary Minor C Hurling Championship (1) 2009
 North Tipperary Minor C Hurling Championship (1) 2003
 North Tipperary Minor B Football Championship (1) 1990

Notable players
 Kevin O'Halloran (Inter-county footballer for Tipperary) 
 John Sheedy (Former goalkeeper with the Tipperary senior team)
 Liam Sheedy (Current Tipperary manager and former manager then they won the 2010 All Ireland title)
 Darren Gleeson (All-Star goalkeeper 2014)
 Robert Byrne (Member of Tipperary All-Ireland championship winning team)

References

External links
Tipperary GAA site

Gaelic games clubs in County Tipperary
Hurling clubs in County Tipperary
Gaelic football clubs in County Tipperary